George Figg (13 June 1824 – 20 July 1888) was an English cricketer. Figg was a right-handed batsman who bowls right-arm roundarm medium. He was born at Horsham, Sussex.

Figg made a single first-class appearance for Middlesex against Surrey at Lord's in 1850. Figg failed to score any runs or take any wickets during the match. Fifteen years later, Figg made a second first-class appearance, this time for Sussex against Nottinghamshire at Trent Bridge. He made nine further first-class appearances for Sussex, the last of which came against Kent in 1866. In his ten first-class appearances for the county, he took 38 wickets at an average of 18.47, with best figures of 6/42. One of three five wicket hauls he took, his best figures came against Kent in 1865. With the bat, he scored 77 runs at a batting average of 7.00, with a high score of 26 not out.

He died at the town of his birth on 20 July 1888.

References

External links
George Figg at ESPNcricinfo
George Figg at CricketArchive

1824 births
1888 deaths
People from Horsham
English cricketers
Middlesex cricketers
Sussex cricketers